Chukadeh (also Romanized as Chūkadeh; also known as Chūgdeh and Chūgūdeh) is a village in Hajji Bekandeh-ye Koshk-e Bijar Rural District, Khoshk-e Bijar District, Rasht County, Gilan Province, Iran. At the 2006 census, its population was 317, in 98 families.

References 

Populated places in Rasht County